Czarny Staw pod Rysami (Black Lake below Mount Rysy) is a mountain lake on the Polish side of Mount Rysy in the Tatra mountains. At 1,583 m above sea level, it overlooks the nearby lake of Morskie Oko. Its maximum depth is 76 m. A walking path circumnavigates the lake, and leads up to Mount Rysy, or down to Morskie Oko.

To get to Czarny Staw from Morskie Oko you must follow the red trail on the Eastern side of Morskie Oko. Once you have reached about half-way you will see a signpost that has directions on how to get to Czarny Staw. After crossing the rocky inclined path, you will arrive at Czarny Staw. The trip takes about 50 mins going up from Morskie Oko and 40 mins going back down.

Gallery

Lakes of Poland
Tourist attractions in Lesser Poland Voivodeship
Lakes of Lesser Poland Voivodeship
Lakes of the High Tatras